Greuter is a surname. Notable people with the surname include:

Mary Helen Wright Greuter (1914–1997), American astronomer and historian
Matthaeus Greuter (1564–1638), German etcher and engraver
Ursina Greuter, Swiss paralympic athlete
Werner Greuter (born 1938), Swiss botanist